Dalanjargalan (Seventy happiness also Ulaantolgoi)) is a sum (district) of Dornogovi Province in south-eastern Mongolia. Sum center is Olon Ovoo railway station on Trans-Mongolian Railway (Ulan Bator - Beijing)  line and abandoned Soviet air force base location. Eldev Coal Mine is 21 km N from sum center. In 2009, its population was 2,554.

References 

Districts of Dornogovi Province